Leonardus ("Leen") Eustachius Jansen (3 August 1930 – 27 January 2014) was a boxer from the Netherlands, who competed for his native country at the 1952 Summer Olympics in Helsinki, Finland. There he was stopped in the quarterfinals of the men's Middleweight (−75 kg) division by eventual winner Floyd Patterson of the United States.

1952 Olympic results
Below are the results of Leen Jansen of the Netherlands who competed as a middleweight at the 1952 Olympic boxing tournament in Helsinki:

 Round of 32: bye
 Round of 16: defeated Robert Malouf (Canada) by technical knockout in the first round
 Quarterfinal: lost to Floyd Patterson (United States) by knockout in the first round

After the Summer Olympics Jansen became a professional. He boxed a total 71 matches, of which he won 60 (27 KOs). His last fight was on 2 October 1967 in his home town of Rotterdam, where he was defeated on points by Johnny Halafihi of Tonga.

Since 1980 he lived in Sint-Maartensdijk with his daughter and dog. There he taught boxing through his 80s. On 27 January 2014, Jansen died in the hospital of Bergen op Zoom at the age of 83.

References

1930 births
2014 deaths
Middleweight boxers
Olympic boxers of the Netherlands
Boxers at the 1952 Summer Olympics
Boxers from Rotterdam
Dutch male boxers